Waldo E. Martin (born 19 April 1951) is an American historian.

Life
He received his BA degree from Duke University and his PhD from University of California Berkeley.

Career
He is currently the Alexander F. and May T. Morrison Professor of American History and Citizenship at the University of California in Berkeley.

Distinctions
He is a member of the Organization of American Historians.

Bibliography
Some of his books include the following:

 Brown v. Board of Education: A Brief History with Documents 
 No Coward Soldiers: Black Cultural Politics in Postwar America 
 Mind of Frederick Douglass 
 Muller v. Oregon and Our Hearts Fell to the Ground and Era of Franklin D.: Roosevelt and Brown v. Board of Education 
 The World of Martin Luther King, 1929-1968  
 Civil Rights In The United States 
 Black Against Empire: The History and Politics of the Black Panther Party, co-authored with Joshua Bloom (2013)

References

External links
 

African-American historians
21st-century American historians
21st-century American male writers
Duke University alumni
University of California, Berkeley alumni
1951 births
Living people
American male non-fiction writers
21st-century African-American writers
20th-century African-American people
African-American male writers